Thulium(III) iodide is an iodide of thulium, with the chemical formula of TmI3.  Thulium(III) iodide is used as a component of metal halide lamps.

Preparation 

Mercury(II) iodide can be heated with thulium to obtain thulium(III) iodide:

 2 Tm + 3 HgI2 → 2 TmI3 + 3 Hg

The mercury produced in the reaction can be removed by distillation.

The thulium(III) iodide hydrate crystallized from solution can be heated with ammonium iodide to obtain the anhydrous form.

Properties 

Thulium(III) iodide is a yellow, highly hygroscopic solid with a bismuth(III) iodide-type crystal structure. It forms in the hexagonal crystal system. Its hydrate can be heated in air to obtain TmOI. Its anhydrous form can be heated with thulium to obtain TmI2:

 2 TmI3 + Tm → 3 TmI2

References 

Thulium compounds
Iodides
Lanthanide halides